Julie Power (also known as Lightspeed) is a character appearing in American comic books published by Marvel Comics. Created by Louise Simonson and June Brigman, the character first appeared in Power Pack #1.

Publication history
Julie Power featured in all 62 issues of Power Pack published by Marvel Comics between 1984 and 1991. Between issues #1 and #25 of the original Power Pack series, Julie starred as the alter-ego of the superhero Lightspeed, but her superhero codename changed to Molecula when she gained her brother Jack's powers during the course of a storyline. She continued as Molecula between issues #25—52 until she regained her original powers and superhero name, which she retained until Power Packs cancellation with issue #62. Julie later appeared in both the 1992 Power Pack Holiday Special and Power Pack vol. 2 miniseries "Peer Pressure", which was published in 2000, at some point changing her superhero name to Starstreak in the intervening years. During this publishing hiatus, her only appearances were brief cameos in New Warriors.

Outside the Power Pack series of comics, she has since appeared in Runaways vol. 2, in the short-lived Runaways spin-off title Loners, and presumably as a background character when that team later appeared in the miniseries War of Kings: Darkhawk (though she is not identified specifically at any point during this series). Julie appeared as a regular character in Avengers Academy from issue #20 (Dec. 2011) through its final issue #39 (Jan. 2013). Julie has also appeared in several non-canon alternate continuity titles such as Exiles, Marvel Zombies vs Army of Darkness and various Power Pack miniseries aimed at younger readers.

Fictional character biography
Julie Power was born in Richmond, Virginia to Dr. James Power and Margaret Power. She was a founding member of the superhero team Power Pack. The second oldest of the four Power siblings, she was 10 years old when she was given her powers by Aelfyre Whitemane, a dying Kymellian noble. She continued to operate with Power Pack through their entire history, later relocating to Los Angeles to live on her own after quitting the team in unrevealed circumstances.

Julie was the only Power family member who had a birthday happen within the comic series, aging from 10 to 11 years old. In the later 2000 mini-series (which makes no references to 'current' Marvel continuity and thus cannot be objectively placed in canon) she is 14, in Runaways vol. 2 #1 she is nebulously identified as being an "ex-teenager", but in the later Loners #4, Julie identifies herself as being 17 years old. In the letter column of Avengers Academy #31, Julie is identified as being about 19 years old.

Power Pack
After the events of Power Pack #1-#5 which detailed the team's origin, the Power family moved from Virginia to New York City. There, Power Pack encountered other superheroes such as Spider-Man, and Cloak and Dagger. They also met Franklin Richards, and encountered the New Mutants. Julie's powers were later siphoned into the Snark Jakal; when returned, her powers were exchanged with those of her brother Jack, and she became Molecula'''. Eventually, she regained her original powers and resumed her original codename. Power Pack then encountered Galactus and Nova.

Julie was perhaps the most "normal" of the Power siblings. When she was not in "superhero mode" Julie could be quite shy and quiet; in several instances, she was bothered by bullies at school. Her solo storylines often involved regular "kid issues" such as babysitting and cheating on tests. Julie was also a voracious reader, and was frequently seen reading, carrying or quoting books, even graduating elementary school with honors in English. She frequently stepped into a maternal role with her siblings, sewing and washing the team's costumes, caring for Katie and Franklin Richards and attempting to restore peace during conflicts.

In battles, Julie possessed quick reflexes and was a strong fighter. In the Pack's initial conflict with Prince Jakal, Julie was able to singlehandedly bring down the Snark's ship. She was also the only member of Power Pack in the original series to be directly responsible for the death of another character—Pestilence, in the Fall of the Mutants, fell to her death when Julie struck her with the "Julie Hammer" battle technique (though Pestilence might have survived had she not resisted Katie's attempt to pull her to safety).

Excelsior/Loners
Julie's personality detailed above changed during unrevealed circumstances and she was reintroduced during the 'Runaways: True Believers' story-arc as a flighty, naive, wannabe actress who lacked worldly experience despite her many adventures with Power Pack. It is initially revealed in Runaways that because of her time with Power Pack, Julie decided to retire from super-heroics because she had missed out on having a normal childhood, though this later changes to her retiring from super-heroics to protect the privacy of her family and focus on developing a private life of her own away from prying eyes, and so she moved to Los Angeles to seek fame as an actress. This also later changes to her retiring from super-heroics to develop an identity of her own away from her family or other superheroes, prompting her to join the superhero group Excelsior. However, she (as well as the others within the group) agree to go on a mission offered by Rick Jones (though they don't know his identity at the time) to return the Runaways to the foster care from which they had escaped at the conclusion of their first series in exchange for one million dollars and a refitted Avengers Quinjet. Though this initial mission for the fledgling Excelsior team was a failure, they spend the next few months continuing to pursue the Runaways regardless, before discontinuing their pursuit and deciding never to use their powers ever again in unrevealed circumstances that occurred sometime before the beginning of the Loners miniseries, but which could be related to the events of Civil War.

During a misunderstanding between Hollow (the mutant formerly known as Penance) and Ricochet, Julie appears without warning or explanation and is stabbed through the shoulders or gut (art and dialogue on the first page of issue 4 indicate different and contradictory injuries) by Hollow's claws. She claims that her 'alien metabolism' allows her to recover quickly from the wound, and she - apparently jokingly - suggests this is also why she is so skinny, though it is not explained how her healing ability works now that she is separated from her siblings, as physical contact between them is required to heal grievous wounds, while the ability works passively if they are in regular contact, and they become prone to debilitating sicknesses and viral infections if kept apart from each other for any reason.

Julie reveals to the group that her flighty personality and seemingly low intelligence is really a facade that she adopted when she moved to California, that she has merely been pretending to be unintelligent for the preceding two years in order to fit in with the rest of her teammates, and also that she has not registered with local authorities as an active superhuman. Despite admitting her flighty persona is an affectation, Julie continues to act exactly as before for the remaining issues of Loners, and in the final issue's closing montage is seen playing absentmindedly with her hair much as she does in issue #4 when suggesting she is merely playing a part for the benefit of others.

Throughout Loners, Julie suggests in her narrative that she hides a secret from the rest of her team, and in issue #5 reveals she is not registered as a superhero with the government. In issue #6, however, Phil Urich alludes that Julie "of all people" should respect that he is still keeping something (details of his and Mickey Musashi's dealings with the Loners' enemies) from the group: later, Mickey Musashi asks Julie if "there's anything more you want to open up about?", but Julie declines, stating she's "still confused".

Avengers Academy and the Runaways
Julie was seen (among the other young heroes) to be arriving on the new campus for the Avengers Academy. She is attending at the Academy as both a student and a teacher's assistant, under Quicksilver's tutelage. When fellow Academy member Striker confides to her that he is gay, she confirms that she is bisexual. During an earlier encounter with the Runaways, Julie and Karolina Dean express a close personal interest in each other in the middle of combat before they are rudely interrupted by Molly Hayes. Following a later joint mission of the Avengers Academy and the Runaways, Julie and Karolina agree to go on a date, and eventually they end up being romantically involved.

Some time afterwards, Julie visited the Runaways, but Karolina's lack of commitment to their relationship created friction between them. In her despondent mood, Julie ended up consuming a magical cupcake originally given to Molly Hayes by her new schoolfriend, Abigail, a 13-year-old girl rendered ageless by a gift from the Enchantress. Eating the cupcake regressed Julie to a 13-year-old herself. Though the problem was fixed by an antidote the Enchantress had provided, Julie nevertheless broke up with Karolina.

Future Foundation
When circumstances prompted Julie to be drawn in to assist the Future Foundation when they were under threat, she revealed her recent run of bad luck to Alex, who apologized for not being there for his sister through her coming out and bad break-up. To help Julie get back on her feet, Alex offered her a position as a teacher with the Future Foundation. During a mission in a space prison to help reassemble the disintegrated Molecule Man, Julie encountered the reality-displaced Rikki Barnes, which resulted in a mutual romantic attraction.

Powers and abilities
Julie's original power (and that most associated with the character) was unaided flight by means of rapid forward propulsion that left a highly visible tri-colored band of light in her wake. Julie could only remain aloft while in motion, however, as she discovered when she first used her powers, only managing to stop when she accidentally collided with the bulkhead of a Snark starship and broke her arm. Julie never flew at the speed of light as her codename suggested and her top speed remains unknown, but it was supposed by her brother Alex on one occasion that she had broken the sound barrier.

Julie gained the density powers previously held by her brother Jack for a time and operated under the name Molecula. She expanded upon her new powers by learning to create force fields and bubbles, the latter of which could be employed to cushion herself or others from falls. Julie also learned to make herself taller and larger without transforming into a cloud - though she still retained the same mass and would become tired when increasing her height and stature for long periods of time.

Julie eventually regained her original acceleration powers and continued as a member of Power Pack under her original codename, Lightspeed.  She did not develop any new permutations of - or applications for - this ability, however, until after she changed her codename once again, this time to Starstreak. Just as she expanded her mass-controlling abilities as Molecula, Julie eventually refined her original abilities so she could teleport over great distances without any visible sign of exhaustion.

In unrevealed circumstances at some point between the Power Pack (2000) miniseries and her reappearances in both the second Runaways series and the Loners miniseries, after returning to her original codename once again; Julie learned to refine her powers so she could now hover in the air without having to accelerate to stay aloft, and could also now physically stand upon her own rainbow trail, use it as an impromptu cushion against falls, or even as a hammock.

During their battle with Ultron, Turbo orders Julie "Shields up and try to draw its fire", shortly before Ultron shoots Julie out of the air using the same energy blasts with which he had just murdered the mother of Victor Mancha, an event Julie survives with no visible ill-effects.

Along with her siblings, Julie possesses Kymellian healing powers. Julie is the first Power sibling to use this ability, albeit unconsciously, when her broken arm mysteriously heals quickly during the Pack's initial conflict with the Snarks. Later in the series she heals herself automatically, after switching to cloud form and back, when her legs are seriously injured during a battle with the mutant team Trash. When her brother Jack calls attention to it during the battle, Julie answered, "Yeah, that happens sometimes".

With her siblings, Julie owns a Kymellian smartship, Friday. The ship acts as an unofficial team advisor and accompanied the Pack on several missions.  As with other members of Power Pack, it is not seen during Julie's appearances in Loners - though she does mention Friday in passing during her first mission with (what was then known as) Excelsior on their search for the Runaways.

 Equipment 
Julie wears a costume of unstable molecules created by Friday. The costume exists in an extra-dimensional space known as "Elsewhere" until summoned by voice command (the wearer would say the words "costume on!"). The costume also houses a communicator which is used to communicate with Friday, and is later modified to include a mask. As with all the team's costumes, the pockets of the costume can be used as an access point to Elsewhere itself, where the cartoon-like creatures known simply as "The Tailors" reside in a colorful wonderland of talking dinosaurs, enchanted forests, mad monarchs, surreal architecture and malleable physical laws.

 Reception 

 Accolades 

 In 2020, CBR.com ranked Julie Power 9th in their "Marvel Comics: 10 Most Powerful Students At Avengers Academy" list.
 In 2020, Scary Mommy included Julie Power in their "Looking For A Role Model? These 195+ Marvel Female Characters Are Truly Heroic" list.
 In 2021, Screen Rant included Julie Power in their "10 LGBTQ+ Marvel Heroes That Should Join The MCU" list.
 In 2022, CBR.com ranked Julie Power 3rd in their "10 Fastest Marvel Sidekicks" list.

Other versions
Avengers and Power Pack Assembled
In Avengers and Power Pack Assembled, an older Julie is encountered by Power Pack when they are banished to an alternate future by Kang the Conqueror. She is a 23-year-old woman who bears a notable resemblance to her mother and possesses her father's scientific brilliance in addition to her Kymellian powers. It remains unclear how she and her family could exist in this timeline, since its creation hinges on their absence.

House of M
In the "House of M" storyline, Julie, along with her brother Alex, was seen as a member of a super-powered gang that called themselves the Wolfpack.

Exiles: Days of Then and Now
In Exiles: Days of Then and Now, Julie is a member of Quentin Quire's unnamed team of superheroes, the last survivors against the Annihilation Wave that was led by a banished Hulk.

Millennial Visions
In the "Power Pack: Starting Over" story (in actuality not a story but a one-page pitch for a theoretical series) within Marvel's 2001 Millennial Visions one-shot comic, Julie is a 30-year-old researcher for SETI. She is depicted as being the most stable of the four Power siblings, who are estranged from each other, and reunites them to fight the Snarks again.

Marvel Zombies
In Marvel Zombies vs Army of Darkness, Julie is seen alongside her Power Pack cohorts as zombies who come into conflict with Nextwave, whom (we are informed by a caption box in the style of the Nextwave comic) Power Pack then graphically murder "in the most humiliating and degrading ways imaginable" off-panel several seconds later.

In other media
Video games
 Lightspeed is a playable character in Lego Marvel's Avengers'', voiced by Skyler Samuels.

References

External links
Marvel.com profile

Characters created by Louise Simonson
Comics characters introduced in 1984
Fictional bisexual females
Fictional characters from Virginia
Fictional characters who can change size
LGBT superheroes
Marvel Comics characters who can move at superhuman speeds
Marvel Comics characters who can teleport
Marvel Comics characters with accelerated healing
Marvel Comics child superheroes
Marvel Comics female superheroes
Marvel Comics LGBT superheroes
Marvel Comics mutates
Marvel Comics superheroes
Power Pack